Acraea quirinalis is a butterfly in the family Nymphalidae. It is found in the central and eastern part of the Democratic Republic of the Congo, Uganda, western Kenya and north-western Tanzania.

Description

A. quirinalis Smith is very similar to the preceding species, [  A. orestia ]  but has a sharply defined red-yellow basal area on the upperside of the forewing, reaching the apex of the cell and vein 3 and enclosing a black longitudinal streak in the basal part of the cell; the red-yellow colour on the forewing quite the same as that of the hindwing; marginal band of the hindwing distinctly broader than in orestia, about 4 mm. in breadth. 
Eastern Congo district; Uganda; German and British East Africa. 

The larvae feed on Urera hypselodendron and Laportea ovalifolia.

Taxonomy
It is a member of the Acraea masamba species groupbut see also Pierre & Bernaud, 2014

References

External links

Images representing Acraea quirinalis at Bold.

Butterflies described in 1900
quirinalis
Butterflies of Africa
Taxa named by Henley Grose-Smith